New Mexican cuisine is the cuisine of the Southwestern US state of New Mexico. The region is primarily known for its fusion of Pueblo Native American cuisine with Hispano Spanish and Mexican cuisine originating in Nuevo México. 

This cuisine had adaptations and influences throughout its history, including early on from the nearby Apache, Navajo, and throughout New Spain and the Spanish Empire, also from French, Italian, Portuguese, and other Mediterranean cuisine, along with early European bed and breakfasts and cafés, furthermore during the American territorial phase from cowboy chuckwagons and Western saloons, additionally after statehood from Route 66 American diner, Mexican-American cuisine, fast food restaurants, and global cuisine. 

Even so, New Mexican cuisine developed in fairly isolated circumstances, which has allowed it to maintain its indigenous, Spanish, Mexican and Latin identity, and is therefore not like any other Latin food originating in the contiguous United States. It can be easily distinguished from Mexican and American cuisines, due to its emphasis on New Mexican spices, herbs, flavors, and vegetables; especially red and green New Mexico chile peppers, anise (used in biscochitos), and piñon (used as a snack or in desserts). 

It is also identifiable by the presence of foods and dishes that originate in New Mexico, such as Native American frybread-style sopapillas, breakfast burritos, enchilada montada (stacked enchiladas), green chile stew, carne seca (a thinly sliced variant of jerky), green chile burgers, pozole (a hominy dish), slow-cooked frijoles (beans, typically pinto beans), calabacitas (a sautéed zucchini and summer squash dish), and carne adobada (pork marinated in red chile).

History

Prior to the establishment of New Mexico's current boundaries, Santa Fe de Nuevo México's land claim encompassed the Pueblo peoples and also oversaw the land of the Chiricahua, Comanche, Mescalero, and Navajo. 

The Spaniards brought their cuisine which mingled with the indigenous. They introduced wheat, rice, beef, mutton/lamb, among other foods and flavors, to the native corn, chile, beans, squash, and other indigenous ingredients. 

During this early development period the horno, an outdoor beehive-shaped earth oven, became ubiquitous in Pueblo and Hispano communities. This distinct history, combined with the local terrain and climate, has resulted in significant differences between the cuisine of New Mexico and somewhat similar styles in Northern Mexico, and other Southwestern US states such as California, Arizona, and Texas.

New Mexico's population includes Native Americans who have worked the land thousands of years, including the farms of the Ancestral Pueblo peoples as well as the modern extant Pueblo, Navajo and Apache. The Hispano explorers included farmers and ranchers as they arrived during the Spanish era in the 16th century, well into the Mexican era which ended in the 19th century. 

Americans traded and settled after the Civil War, today groups from Asian and communities have come to New Mexico.

When New Mexicans refer to chile they are talking about pungent pods, or sauce made from those pods, not the concoction of spices, meat or beans known as Texas chili con carne. While the chile pod is sometimes spelled chili outside of New Mexico, US Senator Pete Domenici of New Mexico made this state's spelling official as chile, by entering it into the Congressional Record.

One of the first authors to publish a cookbook describing traditional New Mexican cuisine was educator and writer Fabiola Cabeza de Baca Gilbert, who published Historic Cookery in 1931. Her work helped introduce cooking with chiles to the United States more broadly.

Ingredients

Chile

New Mexico chile is the defining ingredient of New Mexican food. Chile is New Mexico's largest agricultural crop. Within New Mexico, green chile is also popular in non-New Mexican cuisines including Mexican-style food and American food like cheeseburgers, french fries, bagels, and pizza.

The New Mexico official State Question is "Red or green?" This refers to the choice of red or green chile with an entrée. "Christmas," a relatively new tradition originating in the 1980s, is a request for both (one side covered with green, the other with red). New Mexico red and green chile have such a rich and distinctive flavor that traditional preparations require few additional flavoring ingredients. The essence of New Mexico chile preparation is its simplicity.

The New Mexico green chile is a variety of the chile pepper, Capsicum annuum, and was developed as a recognizable strain in New Mexico by the late nineteenth century. It is available today in several distinct and selectively-cultivated strains called cultivars. 

The chile pepper is grown in the state's very high altitude (4,000–8,000 ft) and dry, hot climate. Much like grapes for wine, these growing conditions contribute, along with genetics, to giving New Mexico green chile its distinctive deep green color, texture, and flavor. 

The climate of New Mexico tends to increase the capsaicin levels in the chile pod compared to pods grown in other regions. This results in the possibility of hotter varieties. New Mexico green chiles can range from mild to extremely hot. 

At harvest time (August through the middle of October) green chile is typically roasted, peeled and frozen for the year ahead. Chile is such a staple in New Mexico that many national restaurant chains offer New Mexico chile at their New Mexico locations.

New Mexico red chile is simply the fully ripened green chile pepper. As it ripens, it first turns orange and then quickly turns red. As it does so, the skin thickens and fuses to the inner fruit or "meat" of the pepper. This means that, for the red pepper to be enjoyable, it must first be dried then blended into a puree. The puree can be made using full red chile pods or red chile powder (which is made by finely grinding the dried pod). 

The purée is not edible until cooked as red chile sauce. This is made by cooking the puree with garlic, salt—and occasionally oregano—and has the consistency of tomato soup. Discerning native New Mexicans prefer sun-dried over oven-dried red chile, as the oven-drying process gives it a non-traditional smoky flavor and a dark maroon color. 

Red chile peppers are traditionally sun-dried in bundles called , which are a common decorative sight on porches and in homes and businesses throughout the Southwest. The process of creating the ristra is highly labor-intensive, so in recent decades it has become a predominantly decorative item.

The bulk of New Mexico chile is grown in the Hatch Valley in the south of the state, in and around the village of Hatch. It is also grown along the entire Rio Grande Valley, and Chimayo in the north is also well known for its chile.

Piñon 

Piñones, or piñon nuts, are a traditional food of Native Americans and Hispanos in New Mexico that is harvested from the ubiquitous piñon pine tree. The state of New Mexico protects the use of the word piñon for use with pine nuts from certain species of indigenous New Mexican pines. The harvest doesn't generally arrive in full force until after New Mexico’s first freeze of the winter.

Other ingredients

Wheat flour tortillas are more prevalent in New Mexico cuisine as a table bread than corn tortillas. However, corn tortillas, corn tortilla chips, and masa are the foundations of many traditional New Mexico dishes, and sometimes made of blue corn. Common traditional dishes include enchiladas, tacos, posole, tamales, and sopaipillas and honey served with the meal. 

Corn (maize) remains a staple grain, the yellow sweet corn variety is most common in New Mexico, though white is sometimes used, and blue and red flint corn varieties are used for specialties like  and blue-corn tortilla chips.  Kernel corn and corn on the cob are frequent side dishes, as in the American South.

Corn is not a frequent component of New Mexico  or pico de gallo, and is usually a separate side dish in and of itself.

Anise is common in some desserts, especially the state cookie, the bizcochito. 

Cilantro, a pungent green herb (also called Mexican or Chinese parsley, the seeds of which are known as coriander) used fresh in salsas, and as a topping for virtually any dish; not common in traditional New Mexican cuisine, but one of the defining tastes of Santa Fe style. 

Cumin, the quintessential "Mexican food" spice, is used very differently in New Mexican food, usually reserved for spicing ground beef and sometimes other meats for burritos, tacos, and nachos. It is not used to flavor red and green chile sauces. Oregano is a sparingly used but common herb in traditional New Mexican dishes.

The early Spanish Colonies along the Rio Grande River in New Mexico used safflower as a substitute for saffron in traditional recipes.  An heirloom variety originating from Corrales, New Mexico, called "Corrales Azafran" is still cultivated and used as a saffron substitute in New Mexican cuisine.

Foods and dishes

 (meatball soup)—traditionally made with beef broth, ground pork or beef, vegetables and rice. Albóndigas is the term for the dish as well as the meatball itself.
—sweet rice pudding, a traditional Northern New Mexican dessert, primarily popular in traditional homes, and rarely found in restaurants.  Rice is generally cooked in milk and water. Then, simmered with sugar and raisins,  garnished with cinnamon, and served hot.
—a thick, hot gruel made from blue corn meal in New Mexico.
—anise-flavored cookie sprinkled with cinnamon sugar, traditionally made with lard. It was developed by residents of New Mexico over the centuries from the first Spanish colonists of what was then known as Santa Fe de Nuevo México. Although biscochitos may sometimes be found at any time of year, they are a traditional Christmas cookie.
—the New Mexico burrito is a white-flour tortilla with fillings of meat, such as pork carnitas, chicken, ground or shredded beef or carne adovada, refried pinto beans, or both meat and beans, along with red or green chile.
Breakfast burrito—a breakfast version of the above, typically including scrambled eggs, potatoes, red or green chile, cheese (usually Cheddar), and sometimes bacon or sausage; originated in New Mexico.

Calabacitas: Chopped summer squash with onions, garlic, yellow corn, green chile, sauteed in oil.
Caldillo—a thin, green or red chile stew or soup of meat (usually beef, often pork or a mixture), potatoes, and chiles. Sometimes called , especially as a side dish. Both terms are diminutive forms of the Spanish word, for soup.
—a bread-pudding dessert, traditionally made during Lent festivities. Capirotada is made of toasted bread crumbs or fried slices of birote or bolillo bread, then soaked in a syrup made of melted sugar, or piloncillo, and cinnamon. It usually contains raisins, and possibly other fruits and nut bits. Finely grated cheese may be added when it's still hot from the oven, so that it melts. Served warm or cold.
—cubes of pork that have been marinated and slow cooked in red chile sauce, garlic and oregano.
—roasted or broiled meat (often flank steak), marinated.
—literally translated to "dried meat", in New Mexican cuisine refers to a unique style of thinly sliced jerky which has a cracker or potato chip-like texture.
Carnitas—grilled or broiled cubes of pork, traditionally smothered with red or green chile sauce and served as and entree.
—originating in California-style Mexican cuisine, a corn tortilla fried into a bowl shape and filled with shredded chicken or other meat or beans, and usually topped with guacamole and salsa. (another vegetable-laden version called taco salads; compare with tostadas.)
—deep-fried pieces of pork trimmings usually including a layer of meat.
—chile and melted cheese mixed together into a dip.
—whole green chiles stuffed with cheese, dipped in egg batter, and fried. This dish varies from other Mexican-style cuisines in that it uses the New Mexican chile, rather than a poblano pepper.
 Chile sauce—sauce made from red or green chiles usually served hot. Green chile is made with chopped, roasted fresh or frozen green chiles, while red chile is made from dried, roasted and pulverized ripe (red) chiles. 
Chile is one of the most definitive differences between New Mexican and other Mexican and Mexican-American cuisines (which often make a different green chile sauce from tomatillos). 
New Mexican cuisine uses chile sauce as taco sauce, enchilada sauce, burrito sauce, etc. (though any given meal may use both red and green varieties for different dishes). A thicker version of green chile with onions and other additions is called green chile stew and is popular in Albuquerque-style New Mexican food. 
The green chile sauce is can sometimes be hotter than its red counterpart, though this depends entirely on the chile varieties used.
—a small, deep-fried meat and (usually) bean wheat-tortilla burrito, also containing (or smothered with) chile sauce and cheese; popularized by the Allsup's convenience store chain with a series of humorous commercials in the 1980s with candid footage of people attempting and failing to pronounce the name correctly. 
Chimichangas, like flautas and taquitos, are a fast-food adaptation of traditional dishes in a form that can be stored frozen and then quickly fried as needed; they are also rigid and easily hand-held, and thus easy to eat by people while walking or driving.
—a spicy pork sausage, seasoned with garlic and red chile, usually used in ground or finely chopped form as a breakfast side dish or quite often as an alternative to ground beef or shredded chicken in other dishes.
 (small empanada)—a pasty or turnover filled with sweet pumpkin, fruit, or minced meat, spices and nuts.

—corn tortillas filled with chicken, meat or cheese. They are either rolled, or stacked, and covered with chile sauce and cheese.
, or stacked enchilada—usually covered with either red or green chile sauce, and optionally topped with a fried egg. These stacked enchiladas are also common with blue-corn tortillas.
Fish—being landlocked, New Mexico has no native seafood tradition, but freshwater fish are not uncommon entrees, especially trout. Crayfish are found in New Mexico. In the southeast of the state, crayfish tails are also consumed, as in Texas and Louisiana. While the native population made use of freshwater shellfish since prehistoric times, they are not common in modern New Mexico cuisine, though it has adapted various seafood items (e.g., shrimp tacos are common in restaurants).
—a caramel custard.
—a small, tightly rolled, fried corn tortilla filled with ground beef, chicken, pork or turkey and served topped with guacamole and sour cream. Compare chimichanga and taquito.
 (whole pinto beans)—along with Spanish rice, frijoles are the standard side served with any entrée. Traditional New Mexico beans are cooked very simply with salt pork and garlic. Frijoles are often served whole in New Mexico, rather than as refried beans.
 (refried beans)—whole cooked beans are fried in bacon fat and mashed until they turn into a thick paste. Also known as simply  and often served with a topping of cheese.

Frito pie—a Tex-Mex casserole, made of red chile sauce, sometimes with meat and or pinto beans, atop a bed of Fritos (or similar) corn chips, topped with cheese, usually topped with shredded lettuce, chopped tomato and onion.
Some five-and-dime stores make it by slicing open a bag of Frito's and adding the rest of the ingredients.
Although a Texas invention, it has become popular in New Mexico, and typically uses New Mexican red chile in the state.
Green chile cheeseburger—widely considered the New-Mexican variety of cheeseburger, it is a regular hamburger topped with melted cheese and either whole or chopped green chile. The flavor is very distinctively New Mexican as opposed to other types of hamburgers, and is even offered in the region by major fast food chains.
Green chile cheese fries—a New Mexican variant to traditional cheese fries, fries served smothered with green chile sauce and topped with cheese.
Standard ingredients are coarsely-chopped green chile, ground or cubed beef, ground or cubed pork, potato, diced tomato, onion, garlic, and chicken or beef stock. The stew often contains coarsely-chopped carrots or other vegetables. 
—the traditional New Mexico version is avocados smashed or blended with a very small amount of the following: finely chopped onion, tomato, garlic, salt and lemon juice.
—fried eggs any style on corn tortillas, smothered with red or green chile sauce, topped with shredded cheddar cheese, often served with potatoes or pinto beans. Flour tortillas on the side come standard.
Indian Fry Bread—a traditional thick flatbread of deep-fried dough, developed by the Navajo people after the "Long Walk", when they were forcibly relocated to Bosque Redondo, New Mexico. Served as a snack with honey or for making Navajo tacos. The New Mexico sopaipilla is a variant of this.
—a small, fat chile pepper, ranging from mild to painfully hot. In New Mexican food they are used chopped (fresh) in salsa and guacamole or as a topping (either pickled or fresh) for nachos.
—soft custard-like dessert made from egg whites, milk, white sugar, vanilla, nutmeg, and cinnamon, cooked while whisking on a stove top and served either warm or cold.
Navajo taco—A taco made with frybread, rather than a tortilla.
—a pudding made from sprouted wheat flour and piloncillo. The sprouted-wheat flour is called "panocha flour", or simply "panocha", as well.
Pastelitos (little pies)—a thin pie baked on flat cookie sheet with dried fruit and spices, usually cut into small squares.
 (rooster's beak)—a cold salsa with thick-chopped fresh chiles, tomatoes, onions and cilantro, without tomato-paste base as in commercial packaged salsas, never contains vinegar.
—a thick stew made with hominy and pork. Chicken in lieu of pork is a popular variation. It is simmered for hours with pork or chicken and then combined with red or green chile and other ingredients such as onion, garlic, and oregano. Native New Mexicans include off-cuts of pork (especially pork rinds and pigs feet) in the pork version. They also prefer to use the un-popped hominy kernel, either blue or white, which goes by the same name as the dish, "posole". The un-popped kernels are boiled separately from the other ingredients until the kernels pop revealing the hominy-like form. To New Mexicans, posole is one of the most important of Christmas traditions. The Mexican spelling  is uncommon in New Mexico.
—a traditional New Mexico side dish made with spinach sauteed in bacon fat with onion, garlic, pinto beans, and crushed, red, New Mexico chile flakes. Wild lamb's quarters were the original leafy green for this dish, but now it is extremely rare to find quelites made with them.
—a grilled cheese sandwich of sorts in which two flour tortillas, or one folded, are used instead of bread. It is often lightly oiled and toasted on a griddle to melt the cheese, then served with either salsa, pico de gallo, chile, guacamole and sour cream, as an appetizer or entrée.
 (or sopapilla)—a puffed fried quick bread with a flavor similar to Indian fry bread. The New Mexico version is very large. It is served as a standard table bread at New Mexican restaurants with a squeeze bottle of honey or honey butter. Prior to the Great Depression in the 1930s, they were served with jelly or jam, and honey was used as a substitute and from then on became the traditional accompaniment. They can also become an entrée by stuffing them with savory ingredients such ground beef, shredded chicken, and refried beans.
Stuffed sopapilla—a standard New Mexico entrée, stuffed with various fillings, covered with melted cheddar cheese, usually smothered with red or green chile sauce and topped with shredded iceberg lettuce and diced tomatoes. Fillings include pinto beans, ground beef, shredded beef, shredded chicken, potatoes, spanish rice, and carne adovada. 
Spanish rice: rice with a tomato base and other ingredients, usually a mild dish, but may also be made spicy. Traditional New Mexico versions are made with long-grain rice, onion, and garlic.  Rice may also be served in other fashions, and recipes vary.
—an uncooked mixture of chiles/peppers, tomatoes, onions, frequently blended or mixed with tomato paste to produce a more sauce-like texture than pico de gallo; usually contains lemon juice or vinegar in noticeable quantities.
The green-chile variant usually is mostly green chile and without tomatoes, though some varieties may use some cooked tomatillos; the style does not use avocado (which is very common in California green salsa).
The New Mexico and California styles share a typically large amount of cilantro added to the mix. The word simply means "sauce" in Spanish.
, or picante sauce—a thin, vinegary, piquant (thus its name) sauce of pureéd red peppers and tomatoes with spices, reminiscent of a combination of New Mexico-style chile sauce and Louisiana-style tabasco pepper sauce. (Note: American commercial food producers have appropriated the term to refer simply to spicy packaged salsa.)
Its place in Mexican, Tex-Mex and Californian food, where it is extremely common, especially as a final condiment to add more heat, has largely been supplanted by chile, especially red chile, in New Mexican cuisine.
—a corn tortilla fried into a trough shape, it is filled with meats or beans, and fresh chopped lettuce, onions, tomatoes, and cheese.
The term can also refers to the soft, rolled flour-tortilla variety popularized by fast-food chains (a soft taco), and the flat, unfried corn style favored in Mexico, but most corn tortillas for tacos are fried in New Mexican cuisine.
The entire taco is not fried (a Mexican style known as ), just the shell. Compare , .
 (plural )—meat rolled in cornmeal dough, wrapped traditionally in corn husks (waxed paper is sometimes used for commercial versions), and steamed.
Although there are many delicious variations, the standard New Mexico tamal filling is shredded pork cooked in red chile sauce. New-Mexican tamales typically vary from other tamal styles in that red chile powder is typically blended into the masa. 
—a tightly rolled, deep-fried variant of the corn-tortilla taco, usually filled with beef or chicken; essentially the same as a Mexican , but rolled into a tube shape rather than fried in wedge shape.
Sometimes misspelled "taquita".
It is a traditional dish for Fridays during Lent; some New Mexican restaurants offer it as their Lenten special.
—a flatbread made predominantly either of unbleached white wheat flour or of cornmeal, with wheat flour tortillas the most common in ordinary use.
New Mexico-style flour tortillas are typically thicker and less chewy than those found in Sonora, Mexico. Nevertheless, blue-corn tortillas are a quintessential New Mexico-style tortilla.
—a corn tortilla is deep fried flat until hard and crispy and covered with refried beans, cheese, lettuce, and tomato, with additional toppings such as sour cream and guacamole also added.

Beverages
Chocolate drinks are popular in New Mexico, including the state's various chocolate elixirs. Though both coffee and tea are well represented, with piñon flavored coffee being available at chain cafés such as New Mexico Piñon Coffee House, and tea meals being found at establishments like Saint James Tea Room. Sweet tea, sweetened or unsweetened "sun tea" brewed with the New Mexican sun, and boba tea are very popular in New Mexico. The bizcochito is a common tea biscuit in the region, and is often served with chocolate elixirs, coffee, and tea.

Sodas have a long history in New Mexico, traditional root beer and sarsaparilla share some origins to New Mexico. Besides root beer and sarsaparilla, other craft soda flavor profiles that are common in the region include cactus, piñon, sandia (watermelon), and chile pepper (sweet and spicy, similar to Mexican candies Pulparindo or Pelon Pelo Rico).

Alcohol
New Mexico wine is the oldest wine growing region in the United States, several wines in New Mexico have won awards and are respected internationally. Gruet Winery produces some of the best sparkling wine in the country.

A list of breweries in New Mexico are exemplary of neomexicanus hops, which are the only indigenous US hops variety that are suitable for brewing. As such, the beers from New Mexico have a unique flavor profile, and often win awards as a result.

Restaurants

There have been several restaurants and restaurant chains serving New Mexican cuisine.

See also

References

 
Cuisine of the Southwestern United States
Mexican-American cuisine
New Mexico culture